Suhurlui is a commune in Galați County, Western Moldavia, Romania. Established in 2008 when it was split off from Rediu Commune, it is composed of a single village, Suhurlui.

References

Communes in Galați County
Localities in Western Moldavia